The 1986 Ebel U.S. Pro Indoor was a men's tennis tournament played on indoor carpet courts that was part of the 1986 Nabisco Grand Prix. It was the 19th edition of the tournament and was played at the Spectrum in Philadelphia in the United States from January 27 to February 3, 1986. First-seeded Ivan Lendl won the singles title.

Finals

Singles

 Ivan Lendl defeated  Tim Mayotte by walkover
 It was Lendl's 1st title of the year and the 58th of his career.

Doubles

 Scott Davis /  David Pate defeated  Stefan Edberg /  Anders Järryd 7–6, 3–6, 6–3, 7–5
 It was Davis' only title of the year and the 8th of his career. It was Pate's only title of the year and the 4th of his career.

References

External links
 ITF tournament edition profile

Ebel U.S. Pro Indoor
U.S. Pro Indoor
U.S. Professional Indoor
U.S. Professional Indoor
U.S. Professional Indoor
U.S. Professional Indoor